Prime Minister's XIII, or sometimes informally referred to as the PM's XIII, is the name of a representative rugby league team, comprising Australian players from National Rugby League clubs that did not qualify for the NRL Finals, or whose teams were knocked out during the first three weeks of the finals.

History
The Prime Minister's XIII first played against Papua New Guinea in 2005 at Lloyd Robson Oval in the Papua New Guinean capital, Port Moresby. The team was coached in that match by former Queensland State of Origin coach Mal Meninga, who coached the side until 2012. New South Wales State of Origin coach Laurie Daley then took over from 2013 to 2014 with Ivan Cleary coaching the team in 2015. Meninga, appointed Australian test coach in 2016 also re-took the reins that year.

Originally played in Port Moresby, in recent years the games have been held in various locations around Papua New Guinea, including Lae and Kokopo. Unlike regular international matches, each team is allowed a five-man bench and given unlimited interchanges throughout the match.

Because the selected Australian players are not participating in the NRL finals (and are part of the Australian Test 'train-on' squad), the match is primarily used to keep potential international players match fit ahead of any end-of-season international fixtures. As the match has been played later in September, players who play for a team that has been knocked out in the first two weeks of the finals have been able to be selected for the side.

The match is also used to promote rugby league, as well as humanitarian causes such as HIV and AIDS awareness, among the Papua New Guinean community.

The PM's XIII has never lost a match against Papua New Guinea since the annual fixture commenced, but was held to a 24–24 draw in 2007, after leading 20–0 at half time.

In 2019, the PM's XIII played against the Fiji Prime Minister's XIII for the first time, at the ANZ National Stadium in Suva.

In 2022, after a two-year absence due to the COVID-19 pandemic, the fixture returned with the PM'x XIII playing the PNG PM's XIII at Suncorp Stadium, the first game to be held in Australia.

Results

2005

2006

2007

2008

2009

2010

2011

2012

2013

2014

2015

2016

2017

2018

2019

2022

Players

Captains
Luke Ricketson (2005)
Steve Price (2006)
Mark Gasnier (2007)
Nathan Hindmarsh (2008, 2011)
Johnathan Thurston (2009)
Corey Parker (2010)
Scott Prince (2012)
Robbie Farah (2013)
Greg Bird (2014)
Trent Merrin (2015)
Greg Inglis (2016)
Aaron Woods (2017)
Daly Cherry-Evans (2018, 2022)
Wade Graham (2019)

Coaches

Mal Meninga (2005–2012, 2016–present)
Laurie Daley (2013–2014)
Ivan Cleary (2015)

Records

Team
 Largest winning margins
 58 58–0 vs PNG PM's XIII, National Football Stadium – 24 September 2016.
 42 52–10 v Fiji PM's XIII, ANZ National Stadium – 11 October 2019.
 40 50–10 vs PNG PM's XIII, Kalabond Oval – 29 September 2013.
 40 48–8 vs PNG PM's XIII, National Football Stadium – 23 September 2017.
 34 34–0 vs PNG PM's XIII, Lloyd Robson Oval – 18 September 2005.

Individual
 Most games
 5 Robbie Farah (2006, 2008–09, 2013–14)
 5 Jake Trbojevic (2015–19)
 5 Aaron Woods (2012, 2014, 2016–18)
 4 Greg Bird (2007, 2011, 2013–14)
 4 Tyson Frizell (2016–19)
 4 Michael Jennings (2008–09, 2011–12)
 4 David Shillington (2007, 2009, 2011, 2013)
 Most tries
 6 Jarryd Hayne
 5 Michael Jennings
 4 Blake Ferguson
 4 Chris Lawrence
 Most points
 24 Jarryd Hayne
 22 Mitchell Moses
 20 Michael Jennings
 20 Scott Prince
 18 James Maloney
 Most tries in a match
 3 Michael Jennings (2009)
 3 Mitchell Moses (2016)
 3 Tom Trbojevic (2017)
 3 James Tedesco (2017)
 3 Clinton Gutherson (2019)
 Most points in a match
 18 Mitchell Moses (2016)
 16 Aidan Sezer (2013)
 16 James Maloney (2017)
 14 Johnathan Thurston (2007)

See also

Australia national rugby league team
Australian Aboriginal rugby league team
Junior Kangaroos
Australian Schoolboys rugby league team

References

Australia national rugby league team
National rugby league teams
Prime Minister of Australia
 
Rugby league representative teams in Australia
Rugby clubs established in 2005
2005 establishments in Australia